The Alabama State Lady Hornets basketball team is the women's basketball team that represents Alabama State University in Montgomery, Alabama, United States.  The school's team currently competes in the Southwestern Athletic Conference.

History
Alabama State began play in 1974. They played in the AIAW from 1974 to 1982 before joining the NCAA and the SWAC in 1982.

NCAA Division I Tournament appearances

References

External links